Big Loud is an American independent multi-sector entertainment company located in Nashville, Tennessee, United States. It consists of a record label also known as Big Loud, along with music publishing and talent management divisions. Big Loud was founded in 2013 by Craig Wiseman, Joey Moi, Kevin "Chief" Zaruk, and Seth England. Artists who have recorded for Big Loud include Florida Georgia Line, Morgan Wallen, Chris Lane, Dallas Smith, and Hardy.

History
Big Loud Records was established in 2015 by Nashville-based songwriter Craig Wiseman and Canadian record producer Joey Moi. Big Loud Records' first release was Chris Lane's "Fix". Lane released two albums for the label.

Jake Owen moved to Big Loud in 2018 after ending his contract with RCA Records Nashville. His first single with Big Loud Records, "I Was Jack (You Were Diane)", which topped country music charts that year. The song was the first single from Owen's 2019 album Greetings from... Jake.

After signing to Big Loud Records, Morgan Wallen achieved back-to-back No. 1 hits on the Billboard Country Airplay chart with "Up Down" and "Whiskey Glasses". The Big Loud Records roster expanded to include singer/songwriter Hardy, Mason Ramsey, and Sean Stemaly. Stacy Blythe, vice-president of promotion, was awarded the SVP-VP/Promotion trophy at the 2019 CRS/Country Aircheck Awards.

In 2021, Big Loud signed Canadian country artist Dallas Smith, the record holder for domestic number one hits on the Canada Country chart, to the label. Additionally, Smith, producer Scott Cooke, partner Alex Seif, and Big Loud formed a joint venture, Canadian-based imprint Local Hay Records. Shawn Austin became their first signing to the new label.

Big Loud Records artists

Current roster
Lauren Alaina
Shawn Austin (Local Hay)
Ernest
Larry Fleet
Hardy
Jake Owen
MacKenzie Porter
Dallas Smith
Morgan Wallen (Big Loud/Republic/Mercury)

Former artists
Jillian Jacqueline
Chris Lane
Mason Ramsey (Big Loud/Atlantic)
Sean Stemaly

Songs & Daughters artists 
Hailey Whitters (Songs & Daughters/Pigasus)

Big Loud Publishing
Founded in 2003 by songwriter Craig Wiseman, Big Loud Publishing, previously Big Loud Shirt, is a music publisher in the country format. Big Loud Publishing songwriters include Ashley Leone, Bren Joy, Chris Lane, Chris Tompkins, Craig Wiseman, Ernest Keith Smith, Griffen Palmer, Jacob Durrett, Jamie Moore, Joey Moi, John Byron, Madison Kozak, Matt Dragstrem, Rocky Block, Rodney Clawson and Tiera. Big Loud Publishing has penned more than 90 singles, including Grammy Award winners "Live Like You Were Dying" by Tim McGraw and "Before He Cheats" and "Blown Away" by Carrie Underwood. On August 17, 2020, Big Loud Publishing's "Meant to Be" by Bebe Rexha featuring Florida Georgia Line was certified diamond by the Recording Industry Association of America. The song was name BMI's 2019 Pop Song of the Year. Big Loud Publishing is responsible for more than 50 No. 1 hits for artists including Blake Shelton, Florida Georgia Line, Luke Bryan, Rascal Flatts, LeAnn Rimes, George Strait, Faith Hill, Kenny Chesney, Beverley Knight, Three Days Grace, Jason Aldean, and Chris Lane.

Big Loud Management
Big Loud Management, previously Big Loud Mountain, has focused on artist development in Nashville, Tennessee since 2011. Founded by the four Big Loud partners, the first act Big Loud Management signed was Florida Georgia Line, a country duo that was the Academy of Country Music's first recipients of the ACM Breakout Artist of the Decade Award, ACM Single of the Decade Award and ACM Music Event of the Decade Award in 2019. Big Loud Management's roster includes Ben Burgess, Chris Lane, HARDY, MacKenzie Porter, Sean Stemaly, Bren Joy, Blame My Youth, Dallas Smith and ERNEST. Big Loud Management partnered with Maverick in 2017.

Big Loud Capital
Launched in 2017, Big Loud Capital is a venture capital group that invests in music, technology, and lifestyle industries. It is owned by the four Big Loud partners, Craig Wiseman, Joey Moi, Kevin "Chief" Zaruk and Seth England. Among Big Loud Capital's portfolio is 100 Thieves, Beyond Meat, Califia Farms, Casper, Coupang, 8i, Iris Nova, Kettle & Fire, LearnLux, Madefire, Magic Leap, Plus Capital, Roli, Seed, Stem, Sweetgreen, and Tecovas.

Partners
Big Loud Record's CEO is Seth England. He joined Craig Wiseman at Big Loud Publishing in 2007. England is a member of the Country Music Association (CMA) and Academy of Country Music (ACM), and was recognized in Billboards Nashville Power Players issue in 2018 and 2019, as well as its 40 Under 40 feature in 2014. He was included in Varietys Music City Impact Report in 2017 and Hitmaker List in 2018.

Controversy 
On February 3, 2021, Big Loud Records indefinitely suspended country artist Morgan Wallen, after TMZ posted a video clip on February 2, 2021, that was recorded on January 31 showing Wallen using a racial slur with friends as they were entering his Nashville home.

References 

American country music record labels
American independent record labels
Record labels established in 2015
Record labels based in Nashville, Tennessee